Manurewa East is a suburb of Auckland, New Zealand. Formerly part of Manukau City, it is now under the local governance of Auckland Council, following the merger of Manukau City Council with all of Auckland's other councils in 2010 to form a single authority.

Demographics

Manurewa East had a population of 2,907 at the 2018 New Zealand census, an increase of 402 people (16.0%) since the 2013 census, and an increase of 597 people (25.8%) since the 2006 census. There were 726 households, comprising 1,500 males and 1,407 females, giving a sex ratio of 1.07 males per female. The median age was 30.4 years (compared with 37.4 years nationally), with 693 people (23.8%) aged under 15 years, 744 (25.6%) aged 15 to 29, 1,221 (42.0%) aged 30 to 64, and 252 (8.7%) aged 65 or older.

Ethnicities were 25.1% European/Pākehā, 30.7% Māori, 35.8% Pacific peoples, 27.2% Asian, and 2.4% other ethnicities. People may identify with more than one ethnicity.

The percentage of people born overseas was 35.3, compared with 27.1% nationally.

Although some people chose not to answer the census's question about religious affiliation, 30.9% had no religion, 42.7% were Christian, 2.8% had Māori religious beliefs, 8.0% were Hindu, 1.7% were Muslim, 2.1% were Buddhist and 6.9% had other religions.

Of those at least 15 years old, 234 (10.6%) people had a bachelor's or higher degree, and 534 (24.1%) people had no formal qualifications. The median income was $23,700, compared with $31,800 nationally. 150 people (6.8%) earned over $70,000 compared to 17.2% nationally. The employment status of those at least 15 was that 1,065 (48.1%) people were employed full-time, 225 (10.2%) were part-time, and 138 (6.2%) were unemployed.

Education

Both these schools are coeducational. Rolls are as of

References

Suburbs of Auckland